Dmitri Anatolyevich Malikov (born 14 February 1997) is a Russian football player.

Club career
He made his debut in the Russian Professional Football League for FC Olimpiyets Nizhny Novgorod on 24 April 2017 in a game against FC Chelyabinsk.

He made his Russian Football National League debut for FC Fakel Voronezh on 10 November 2018 in a game against FC Spartak-2 Moscow.

References

External links
 
 Profile by Russian Professional Football League

1997 births
People from Usman, Russia
Living people
Russian footballers
Russia youth international footballers
Association football forwards
FC Spartak Moscow players
FC Znamya Truda Orekhovo-Zuyevo players
FC Fakel Voronezh players
FC Nizhny Novgorod (2015) players
FC Khimik-Arsenal players
FC Torpedo Vladimir players
Sportspeople from Lipetsk Oblast